Benrath may refer to:

 Düsseldorf-Benrath, a part of the city of Düsseldorf in Germany
 Schloss Benrath, a historical building in Düsseldorf-Benrath
 Benrath line, a term of German linguistics (the maken-machen isogloss)

People with the surname
 Karl Benrath (1845–1924), German church historian
 Martin Benrath (1926–2000), German actor